Psara dorcalis is a moth in the family Crambidae. It was described by Achille Guenée in 1862. It is found in the Democratic Republic of the Congo (the former Katanga Province), Rwanda, Réunion, Madagascar and Mauritius.

The larvae feed on Salvia officinalis and Ocimum basilicum.

References

Spilomelinae
Moths described in 1862